The 2019–20 Kansas State Wildcats women's basketball team represented Kansas State University in the 2019–20 NCAA Division I women's basketball season. The Wildcats were led by sixth-year head coach Jeff Mittie. They played their home games at Bramlage Coliseum in Manhattan, Kansas and were members of the Big 12 Conference. They finished the season 16–13, 10–8 in Big 12 play to finish in a tie for fourth place. They were scheduled to be the fifth seed in the he Big 12 Tournament, but it was cancelled before it began due to the COVID-19 pandemic.  The NCAA women's basketball tournament and WNIT were also canceled.

Previous season

The Wildcats finished the season 21–12, 11–7 in Big 12 play to finish in a tie for fourth place. They advanced to the semifinals of the Big 12 women's basketball tournament where they lost to Baylor. They received at-large bid of the NCAA women's basketball tournament as a 9th seed in the Albany Regional where they lost to Michigan in the first round.

Roster

Schedule and results 

Source:

|-
!colspan=9 style=| Exhibition

|-
!colspan=9 style=| Non-conference regular season

|-
!colspan=9 style=| Big 12 regular season

|-
!colspan=9 style=| Big 12 Women's Tournament

Rankings

See also 
 2019–20 Kansas State Wildcats men's basketball team

References 

Kansas State Wildcats women's basketball seasons
Kansas State
2019 in sports in Kansas
2020 in sports in Kansas